The 2013 American Indoor Football season was the eighth season of American Indoor Football (AIF). The Harrisburg Stampede defeated the Cape Fear Heroes 57-42 to win the 2013 AIF Championship.

Standings

 Green indicates clinched playoff berth
 Gray indicates best regular season record

Playoffs

Awards

Individual season awards

AIF All-Stars

References

American Indoor Football seasons
AIF